Hum Paanch ( Us Five) is a 1980 Hindi language action film directed by Bapu and produced by Boney Kapoor. The film features a huge all-star cast including Sanjeev Kumar, Shabana Azmi, Mithun Chakraborty, Nasiruddin Shah, Raj Babbar, Gulshan Grover (in his film debut) and Amrish Puri.

The movie was Boney Kapoor's maiden venture as a producer. A young Anil Kapoor, who is producer Boney Kapoor's brother has a cameo appearance. This film is a remake of 1978 Kannada film Paduvaaralli Pandavaru, directed by Puttanna Kanagal which was also remade by Bapu earlier in Telugu as Mana Voori Pandavulu (1978). The film was distributed by noted distributor R. N. Mandre. The movie was an adaptation of the Mahabharata, fit to a rural scenario with some hints to the various clashes between the Pandavas and the Kauravas and to the characters in the epic.

Cast
Sanjeev Kumar as Krishna
Shabana Azmi as Sundariya
Mithun Chakraborty as Bhima
Deepti Naval as Lajiya
Naseeruddin Shah as Suraj
Raj Babbar as Arjun
Gulshan Grover as Mahavir
Uday Chandra as Swaroop
Amrish Puri as Vir Pratap Singh
Aruna Irani as Nishi
Anil Kapoor as Aadesh
A. K. Hangal as Pandit
Geeta Siddharth as Vir Pratap's Sister
Roopesh Kumar as Vijay
Kanhaiyalal as Lala Nainsukh Prasad Srivastav
Kalpana Iyer in song "Aiye Meherban"
Leena Das  in song "Aiye Meherban"
Phiroza Cooper in song "Aiye Meherban"
Sujata Bakshi in song "Aiye Meherban"

Crew
Director – Bapu
Story – S. R. Puttanna Kanagal
Screenplay – Mullapudi Venkata Ramana
Dialogue – Rahi Masoom Reza, Vinay Shukla
Producer – Surinder Kapoor, Boney Kapoor
Production Company – S. K. Films Enterprises
Cinematographer – Sharad Kadwe
Editor – Kamlakar Karkhanis
Art Director – M. S. Shinde
Costume Designer – Mrs. Kamal Bakshi, Prem Suri
Action Director – Veeru Devgan
Choreographer – Kamal Kumar
Soundtrack – Polydor (now Universal Music India Limited)

Soundtrack

Box office
The film was a super hit and sixteenth highest-grossing movie of 1980.

References

External links 
 

1980 films
Films directed by Bapu
Films with screenplays by Mullapudi Venkata Ramana
Films scored by Laxmikant–Pyarelal
Films scored by S. P. Balasubrahmanyam
Hindi remakes of Kannada films
1980s Hindi-language films
Films based on the Mahabharata